"Suavemente" is a song by Algerian singer Soolking released in February 2022. The song peaked at number one on the French Singles Chart.
The refrain comes from the song "Suavemente" by Elvis Crespo.

Charts

Weekly charts

Year-end charts

References

2022 singles
2022 songs
French-language songs
SNEP Top Singles number-one singles